Paper Chase (also known as Hare and Hounds or Chalk Chase) is a racing game played outdoors (best played within a wood or even a shrubbery maze) with any number of players. At the start of the game, one person is designated the 'hare' and everyone else in the group are the 'hounds'. The 'hare' starts off ahead of everyone else leaving behind a trail of paper shreds (or chalk marks in an urban environment) which represents the scent of the hare. Just as scent is carried on the wind, so too are the bits of paper, sometimes making for a difficult game. After some designated time, the hounds must chase after the hare and attempt to catch them before they reach the ending point of the race. It is generally done over a long distance, but shorter courses can be set. If the hare makes it to the finish line, they get to choose the next hare, or to be the hare themselves. Similarly, the person who catches the hare gets to choose the next hare.

History
A game called "Hunt the Fox" or "Hunt the Hare" was played in English schools since at least the reign of Queen Elizabeth I. Shakespeare appears to make reference to it in Hamlet, when he eludes the guards at Elsinore he cries "Hide, fox, and all after". Around 1800 the game was organised at Shrewsbury School into an outdoor game called "the Hunt" or "the Hounds", to prepare the young gentlemen for their future pastime of fox hunting. The two runners making the trail with paper were called "foxes", those chasing them were called "hounds". Hare coursing rather than fox hunting was used as an analogy when the game spread to Bath School, so the trail-makers were called "hares". This term was made popular by the paper chase scene in Tom Brown's School Days and is still used in modern hashing and in club names like Thames Hare and Hounds, but Shrewsbury continues to use fox hunting terms as evidenced in The Way of All Flesh by Samuel Butler (see below) - "in this case the hare was a couple of boys who were called foxes". The Royal Shrewsbury School Hunt is the oldest cross-country club in the world, with written records going back to 1831 and evidence that it was established by 1819. The club officers are the Huntsman, Senior and Junior Whips whilst the runners are Hounds, who start most races paired into "couples"; the winner of a race is said to "kill". The main inter-house cross-country races are still called the Junior and Senior Paperchase, although no paper is dropped and urban development means the historical course can no longer be followed.

In 1938, British expatriates started the Hash House Harriers in Kuala Lumpur based on this game.

Literary & cinema references
Tom Brown's School Days by Thomas Hughes published in 1857 depicted a meet by the Big-Side Hare and Hounds. Students busily tore up old newspapers copybooks and magazines into small pieces to fill four large bags with the paper ‘scent’. Forty or fifty boys gathered and two good runners were chosen as hares who carried the bags and started across the fields laying the trail. When scent (paper) was located the member of the pack calls "Forward!" - hashers now call “ON! ON!”. Members of the pack worked together finding scent and straining to keep up.

In chapter 39 of his semi-autobiographical novel The Way of All Flesh of 1903, Samuel Butler describes a school based on his alma mater of Shrewsbury. The main protagonist's favourite recreation is running with "the Hounds" so "a run of six or seven miles across country was no more than he was used to".

In the book The Railway Children, written by Edith Nesbit in 1906, the children observe a game of paper chase. The book was made into a television series four times and into a movie twice, the most recent of which was in 2000.

In the novel Daddy Long Legs, written in 1912 by Jean Webster, the girls play a game of paper chase where the hares cheat: they leave a paper trail indicating they entered a locked barn through a high window, while in actuality they went around the building.

In by H.P. Lovecraft's novella At the Mountains of Madness, first published in 1936, the narrator references the game when using paper to blaze a trail through an unexplored city: "Fortunately we had a supply of extra paper to tear up, place in a spare specimen bag, and use on the ancient principle of hare and hounds for marking our course in any interior mazes we might be able to penetrate."

In the 1946 Orson Welles movie, The Stranger, Rankin's students are in the midst of a paper chase through the woods as Rankin kills his former colleague. Rankin mis-directs the "hounds" to keep them from finding the body by moving the shreds of paper.

In the 1954 memoir by Vyvyan Holland, Son of Oscar Wilde, he describes playing paper chase at Neuenheim College in Heidelberg, Germany in 1896.  "[W]hen the river was frozen and the snow lay thick upon the ground, so that it was impossible either to row or to play football, paper chases were organised by the master in charge of games.  No form of exercise is quite so utterly pointless and boring as a paper chase, and we used to try to slink off and get lost and find our way home by ourselves; though this, if discovered, was apt to lead to a painful interview with the games master."

In the 1975 Disney movie, One of Our Dinosaurs Is Missing, the nannies notice a trail of paper scraps on the ground while trying to hide a dinosaur skeleton in a wood. They remark that it must be a paper chase at which point a group of school boys crash through the wood following the trail.

The first episode in 1986 of Series 3 in The Wind in the Willows (TV series) is called Paperchase where the focus is of that game.

See also
Hash House Harriers

References

Outdoor locating games
Children's games